Rhun Williams (born 5 June 1997) is a retired Welsh rugby union player. Rhun played primarily as a fullback for Cardiff Blues, but also could play wing. He was a Wales U20 international.

Williams made his debut for the Cardiff Blues in 2016 having previously played for their academy, Cardiff RFC, Caernarfon RFC and RGC 1404.

In May 2017 Williams was selected for the Wales national team summer 2017 tour of Samoa and Tonga. On 23 May 2017 he withdrew from the squad due to injury and was replaced by Phil Dollman.

Williams announced his retirement in March 2020, after failing to overcome a neck injury sustained two years prior.

References

External links 
Cardiff Blues profile

1997 births
Living people
Cardiff Rugby players
RGC 1404 players
Rugby union players from Bangor, Gwynedd
Welsh rugby union players
Rugby union fullbacks